Anton "Toni" Brunner (born 23 August 1974) is a Swiss farmer and politician who presided over the Swiss People's Party (SVP/UDC) from 2008 to 2016. He was a member of the National Council from 1995 to 2018.

Biography
Born in Wattwil (St. Gallen), Brunner was first elected to the federal parliament in 1995 at the age of 21, as the youngest member ever. In addition to working on his farm, he operated an internet radio station aimed at farmers, and chaired the St. Gallen section of his party.

On 1 March 2008, Brunner succeeded Ueli Maurer as chairman of the national party. Brunner is close to the party's figurehead, Christoph Blocher, who serves as one of several vice chairmen.

In January 2016, soon after the 2015 federal election, where the Swiss People's Party received record gains, Brunner announced that he would step down as the president of the SVP in April. He was succeeded by Albert Rösti on 23 April 2016.

Brunner is a member of the Campaign for an Independent and Neutral Switzerland.

References

External links

Personal homepage 
Biographical entry on the Federal Parliament website 

1974 births
Living people
People from the canton of St. Gallen
Swiss People's Party politicians
Members of the National Council (Switzerland)
Swiss farmers
Campaign for an Independent and Neutral Switzerland